Maywood is an unincorporated community in Fayette County, West Virginia, United States. It was also known as Lees Tree.

References 

Unincorporated communities in West Virginia
Unincorporated communities in Fayette County, West Virginia